The Iron Tree is the first book in the Crowthistle Chronicles, written by Cecilia Dart-Thornton. Written and published in August 2004, The Iron Tree is a suspenseful fantasy novel.

The Crowthistle Chronicles
Although the inside of The Iron Tree states that the Crowthistle Chronicles will consist of three books,

The Iron Tree
The Well of Tears
Fallowblade

there are actually four books in total:
The Iron Tree
The Well of Tears
The Weatherwitch
Fallowblade

Synopsis
The story begins in a small desert town of R'shael in the kingdom of Asqualeth. Jarred and his friends set off on an adventure to explore the world of The Four Kingdoms of Tir. On the way they are ambushed by Marauders, mountain folk that are deformed and spend their lives pillaging villages and unwary travelers. Jarred is found out by his friends to be invulnerable however one of their part is injured and they are forced to take refuge in Marsh Town in the kingdom of Slievmordhu. There Jarred falls in love at first sight with a Marsh daughter Lilith. When the party are to depart Jarred decides to stay and start a family with Lilith; it is soon learned however a terrible curse runs in the family of Lilith and Jarred must try to find the cure before it devours Lilith. Little do they know, they will find Jarred's gift and Lilith's curse stem from a past that intertwines them.

Reception
Kliatt called the book "uneven and flawed", but "more successful in the latter part of her tale".

External links
The Iron Tree at Cecilia Dart-Thornton's web site.

References

2004 Australian novels
Australian fantasy novels